Karate was competed by men and women at the 1994 Asian Games in Hiroshima, Japan. Kata was contested along with Kumite. There were 11 gold medals contested for this sport. All competition took place on October 3, 4 and 5.

Medalists

Men

Women

Medal table

References
 Results

External links 
 Olympic Council of Asia

 
1994 Asian Games events
1994
Asian Games
1994 Asian Games